Raphael Msunga Chegeni is a Member of Parliament in the National Assembly of Tanzania.

Chegeni is Regional Chairperson of The Great Lakes Parliamentary Forum on Peace (AMANI Forum), East Africa Chapter Representative on the Parliamentary Network of the World Bank. He was the chairperson of Commonwealth Parliamentary Association, Tanzania Branch from 2006 to 2010. He is a member of Chama Cha Mapinduzi - CCM, the governing party in Tanzania.  Dr. Chegeni is a Co-President on the Council of Parliamentary Network for Nuclear Disarmament as part of the Middle Power Initiative.  In 2004, he joined the Parliamentarians for Global Action.

Education and early career 
Dr. Raphael Masunga Chegeni is a seasoned politician, finance expert and team leader. He received his PhD in Finance (2003) from the University of Strathclyde and MSc in Finance  (1997) UK, with an Alumni Membership no.83857,  a Post graduate Diploma in Financial Management from Institute of Finance Management (1989) and National Accountancy Diploma from the Dar es Salaam School of Accountancy (1988) before he became a Registered Accountant with the National Board of Accountants and Auditors of Tanzania (NBAA) (1994). On the professional and consulting development space, Dr. Chegeni is a member of the Institute of Directors in Tanzania (IoDT) since September 2013. He is also an Associate Member of the Chartered Institute for Securities and Investment (CISI) of London, UK and he is actively involved in the process of promoting professionalism and professional standards by training traders and market practitioners within the securities and investment Industry both locally and internationally. 
He has attended different courses in Strategic Management, Good Governance and Leadership, corporate governance, Project Management, political economy, election strategies and participated in different International and local workshops/conferences for practitioners and academicians. He attended also high level UN General Assemblies and side events, Commonwealth summits and side events, African Union conferences, The Great Lakes Region summits and Forums and many Regional and international parliamentary forums to mention a few. 
Dr. Chegeni has also co-authored several refereed articles in leading local and International Journals such as African Journal of Finance and Management (AJFM), Business Management Review (BMR), Accounting-Accountability & Performance (AAP) and Journal of Financial Regulations and Compliance (JFRC) 

1.3. SECONDARY SCHOOL EDUCATION 
•	Advanced Certificate of Secondary School (ACSE) - Nyegezi Seminary (May, 1985) 
•	Certificate of Secondary Education (CSE) - Nyegezi Seminary (November, 1982) 
•	Primary School Leaving Certificate - Mkula Primary School (1978)
1.4. OTHER TRAINING
NATIONAL SERVICE (JKT)  - June 1986, Mafinga JKT 
2.0. CORPORATE GOVERNANCE - BOARDS AND LEADERSHIPS 
1.	Board Member – National Board for Materials Management (Ministry of Works (2002-2008)
2.	Board Member- Capital Market & Security Authority (Vice Chair & Chairman Audit Committee)2003-2009)
3.	Member, Ministerial Advisory Board (Ministry of Works)- Tanzania Government Flight Agency(Vice Chair & Chairman Audit Committee (2004-2010)
4.	Board Member- Consolidated Holding Cooperation former PSRC(Vice Chair & Chairman Audit Committee (2008-2011)
5.	Member, Ministerial advisory board(Ministry of Natural Resources & Tourism) National College of Tourism (2006-2009)
6.	Board Member, Tanzania Insurance Regulatory Authority(TIRA) (Vice Chair & Chairman Audit Committee) (2012-2015)
7.	Board Member, National Health Insurance (NHIF) ( Chairman Audit Committee) (2012-2015)
8.	Board Member, Isamilo Group of Companies, Chairman 2016 to date
9.	Board Member, Tanzania Tea Packers(TATEPA), 2017-to date
10.	Board Member, Mega Dynamic Builders SDN.BHD, KL, Malaysia 2019  to date

3.0. EMPLOYMENT HISTORY
1.	Accountant – Ministry of Works (1989-1992) 
2.	Chief Accountant, Caritas Mwanza, a Development Agency of The Catholic Archdiocese of Mwanza – Donor Funded Projects by organizations from Germany, Netherlands, UK, Ireland, Belgium, Switzerland and Italy  (1992-1994)
3.	Project Manager, Financial Assistance to Micro Enterprises (FAME) UNDP Project (1995)
4.	Finance & Administration Manager, Ashanti Goldfields/ Geita Gold Mine (1998-2001)
5.	Parliament of Tanzania (2001-2010)
6.	Managing Director, Max Gold Ltd (2011-2015)
7.	Parliament of Tanzania (2015-2020)
8.	Chairman, ISAMILO GROUP OF COMPANIES (2021 to date) 
4.0. POSITIONS HELD
PARLIAMENTARY POSITIONS
1.	Member of Parliament , Busega Constituency (2001-2010)
2.	Member of Parliament, Busega Constituency (2015-2020)
3.	Member of Parliamentary Standing Committees:- 
•	Finance & Planning Committee ( Vice Chairman) (2001-2005)
•	Trade & Industry Committee ( Member) (2006-2008)
•	Local Authorities Accounts Committee (Member) 2009-2010)
•	Social & Welfare Committee (Vice Chairman) (2016-2017)
•	Budget Committee, Member (2018-2020)
•	Public Investment Committee (Chairman) (2018-2020)
4.	Chairman, The Great Lakes Parliamentary Forum on Peace (2006-2010)
5.	Chairman, Commonwealth Parliamentary Association, Tanzania (2005/10),(2015/20)
6.	Chairman, Parliamentary Forum on the World Bank 2007-2010
7.	Vice President of Global Parliamentary Forum on SALW 2018 to date
8.	Vice President, PNND a Global Parliamentary Network on Middle Powers Initiatives
 OTHER CCM PARTY POSITION
1.	General election – CCM Assist. Campaign Manager & member of strategic team (2010)
2.	Member of CCM National Executive Council (NEC) (2012-2017)

Election 
In 2005 Chegeni was elected for a five-year term.

Valid votes: 53,992 
Registered voters: 79,736 
3,685 spoilt votes

References

External links
 Parliament of Tanzania website
 Tanzania Election Commission

1968 births
Living people
Chama Cha Mapinduzi politicians
Members of the National Assembly (Tanzania)
Alumni of the University of Strathclyde